Kerry William Carpenter (born September 2, 1997) is an American professional baseball outfielder for the Detroit Tigers of Major League Baseball (MLB). He made his MLB debut in 2022.

Amateur career
Carpenter attended Eustis High School in Eustis, Florida, where he batted .463 with three home runs as a senior in 2016. After graduating, he enrolled at St. Johns River State College where he played two years of college baseball before transferring to Virginia Tech to play for the Virginia Tech Hokies for the 2019 season with whom he started 53 games and hit .272 with ten home runs and 45 RBIs. After the season, he was selected by the Detroit Tigers in the 19th round of the 2019 Major League Baseball draft.

Professional career
Carpenter signed with the Tigers and split his first professional season between the Gulf Coast League Tigers and Connecticut Tigers, batting .303 with nine home runs and 35 RBIs over 47 games. He did not play a game in 2020 due to the cancellation of the minor league season. He played 2021 with the Erie SeaWolves and hit .262 with 15 home runs, 74 RBIs, and 24 doubles over 112 games. He returned to Erie to open the 2022 season. He was named Eastern League Player of the Month for May. After batting .304 with 22 home runs and 48 RBIs over 63 games with Erie, he was promoted to the Toledo Mud Hens in late June. 

On August 10, 2022, the Tigers selected Carpenter's contract and added him to the Major League roster. He made his MLB debut the same day as Detroit's starting designated hitter, going hitless over four at-bats. He collected his first MLB hit on August 14, a single versus the Chicago White Sox. He hit his first MLB home run on August 15 off of Eli Morgan of the Cleveland Guardians.

References

External links
Virginia Tech Hokies bio

1997 births
Living people
People from Eustis, Florida
Sportspeople from Lake County, Florida
Baseball players from Florida
Major League Baseball outfielders
Detroit Tigers players
Virginia Tech Hokies baseball players
St. Johns River State Vikings baseball players
Gulf Coast Tigers players
Connecticut Tigers players
Erie SeaWolves players
Toledo Mud Hens players